Rafael Luis Irizarry Cruz is a Puerto Rican politician from the New Progressive Party (PNP). Irizarry served as member of the 22nd Senate of Puerto Rico from 2001 to 2005.

Irizarry was elected to the Senate of Puerto Rico in the 2000 general election. He represented the District of Mayagüez, along with Jorge Ramos Vélez.

See also
22nd Senate of Puerto Rico

References

Living people
Members of the Senate of Puerto Rico
People from Mayagüez, Puerto Rico
Year of birth missing (living people)